Stará Ľubovňa is a town with approximately 16,000 inhabitants in northeastern Slovakia. The town consists of the districts Podsadek and Stará Ľubovňa.

Names
The name is of Slovak or Slavic origin and is potentially derived from a personal name. It comes from a root ľub- meaning lovely, nicely.  The same root is present in Czech Libeň, Polish Lublin, Slovenian Ljubljana and others similar Slavic geographic names. The German name Altlublau and the Hungarian Ólubló were derived from the Slovak version.

Geography
It is one of the oldest towns in the Spiš, an historic administrative county (comitatus) of the Kingdom of Hungary, and is today the administrative capital of the district of Stará Ľubovňa in the Prešov Region.

History

In 1292 Stará Ľubovňa is first mentioned as Libenow. Until it became a free royal town in 1364 the town fell under the jurisdiction of the castle.

In 1412 it belonged to the 16 Spiš towns given by the Hungarian King Sigismund of Luxemburg as a deposit to King Władysław II of Poland. The pledge was part of the Treaty of Lubowla and was thought to be only for a short time, but it finally lasted for 360 years. Only in the course of the first Partition of Poland in 1772 during the reign of Maria Theresa of Austria the territory came back to the Kingdom of Hungary. The pledge was actually an advantage for the towns concerned because they did not have to submit themselves to the comitatus or nobility and had a neutral position in turmoils between Poland and Hungary.

Sights
From a hill over the city the castle of Ľubovňa dominates the city. The castle is open to the public and houses a museum about its history. From its already reconstructed tower there are good views over the surroundings. Next to the castle there is an open-air museum, Ľubovniansky skanzen, with many houses and other buildings showing the folk architecture of the region. The most interesting exhibit is the wooden Greek-Catholic church from Matysová, built in 1833.

The old town consists mainly of the rectangular St. Nicolas Square which is surrounded by burgher's houses of the 17th century. In the centre there is the gothic Roman Catholic Church of St. Nicolas built in 1280.

Another building of interest is the new Greek-Catholic church of the Mother of Eternal Help in the south of the city. It was consecrated by Pope John Paul II on 22 April 1990 and is constructed in the shape of a royal crown.

Demographics
In the 2011 population census, the town had 16,341 residents. According to the 2001 census, the town had 16,227 inhabitants. 89.5% of inhabitants were Slovaks, 5.97% Roma, 1.48% Rusyn, 1.00% Ukrainian and 0.64% Czechs. The religious make-up was 67.65% Roman Catholics, 22.20% Greek Catholics, 5.01% people with no religious affiliation, 1.61% Orthodox and 0.81% Lutherans.

Famous residents 
 Ján Melkovič, actor
 Ján Kubašek, priest and signatory of the Pittsburgh Agreement
 Marián Hossa, professional ice hockey right winger

 Zita Pleštinská, politician and Member of the European Parliament

Twin towns — sister cities

Stará Ľubovňa is twinned with:

 Aleșd, Romania
 Bački Petrovac, Serbia
 Balchik, Bulgaria
 Biograd na Moru, Croatia
 North Augusta, United States
 Nowy Sącz, Poland
 Połaniec, Poland
 Svaliava, Ukraine
 Vsetín, Czech Republic

Gallery

References

Bibliography
Okresný národný výbor: Okres Stara Ľubovňa
Turistický sprievodca: Slovenské kráľovské mestá Bardejov, Kežmarok, Levoča, Stará Ľubovňa

External links
Official website
Museum of Stará Ľubovňa

Cities and towns in Slovakia
Spiš